Per Hallin (born October 17, 1980) is a Swedish professional ice hockey player. He is currently playing for the Timrå IK team in the Swedish Elitserien league. He is the son of former NHL player Mats Hallin.

Playing career
Hallin started his career with Södertälje SK. Having been recruited to Timrå IK after the club was promoted to Elitserien 2000, he skated for the club in seven straight seasons in Elitserien. Hallin signed with his former Södertälje on April 11, 2007, while they were promoted from HockeyAllsvenskan but returned to Timrå IK again 2010. In 2012, he was made the team captain.

External links

References

 
 
 

1980 births
Living people
Swedish ice hockey forwards
Södertälje SK players
Timrå IK players